Beuca is a commune in Teleorman County, Muntenia, Romania. It is composed of two villages, Beuca and Plopi. These were part of Drăcșenei Commune until 2004, when they were split off.

References

Communes in Teleorman County
Localities in Muntenia